Obturator muscles may refer to:
 External obturator muscle
 Internal obturator muscle